Subtercola lobariae is a Gram-positive and aerobic bacterium from the genus Subtercola which has been isolated from the lichen Lobaria retigera from the Jiaozi Snow Mountain in China.

References

External links
Type strain of Subtercola lobariae at BacDive -  the Bacterial Diversity Metadatabase

Microbacteriaceae
Bacteria described in 2017